Purulia Assembly constituency is an assembly constituency in Purulia district in the Indian state of West Bengal.

Overview
As per orders of the Delimitation Commission, No. 242 Purulia Assembly constituency is composed of the following: Purulia municipality; Purulia II community development blocks; Bhandar Purachipida and Manara gram panchayats of Purulia I community development block.

Purulia Assembly constituency is part of No. 35 Purulia (Lok Sabha constituency).

Members of Legislative Assembly

Election results

2021

2016

In the 2016 elections, Sudip Kumar Mukherjee of Indian National Congress defeated his nearest rival Jyotiprasad Singh Deo of All India Trinamool Congress.

2011

In the 2011 elections, Kamakshya Prasad Singh Deo of Trinamool Congress defeated his nearest rival Koushik Majumder of CPI(M).

.# Swing calculated on Congress+Trinamool Congress vote percentages taken together in 2006.

1977-2006

In the 2006 and 2001 state assembly elections, Nikhil Mukherjee of CPI(M) won the Purulia assembly seat defeating his nearest rivals Dr. Sukumar Roy of Congress and Kamakshya Prasad Singh Deo of Trinamool Congress respectively. Contests in most years were multi cornered but only winners and runners are being mentioned. Mamata Mukherjee of CPI(M) defeated Sukumar Roy of Congress in 1996, 1991 and 1987. Sukumar Roy of ICS defeated Mahadeb Mukherjee of CPI(M) in 1982. Mahadeb Mukherjee of CPI(M) defeated Sanat Kumar Mukherjee, Independent, in 1977.

1957-1972
Sanat Kumar Mukherjee of Congress won in 1972 and 1971. Bibhuti Bhusan Dasgupta of Lok Sewak Sangh/ Independent won in 1969 and 1967. Tara Pada Roy of Congress won in 1962. In 1957 Purulia was a joint seat with one seat reserved for SC. Nakul Chandra Sahis, Independent, and Labanya Prabha Ghosh, Independent, won in 1957.

References

Assembly constituencies of West Bengal
Politics of Purulia district
Purulia